Inape tricornuta is a species of moth of the family Tortricidae. It is found in Ecuador (Carchi Province).

The ground colour of the forewings is brownish cream, but browner in costal half of the distal area. The strigulae and dots are brownish and the marking are dark brown. The hindwings are pale brown with some creamer spots.

Etymology
The species name refers to the number of cornuti and is derived from Greek treis (meaning three).

References

Moths described in 2008
Endemic fauna of Ecuador
Moths of South America
tricornuta
Taxa named by Józef Razowski